There are currently 125 batters and 60 records in the 200 RBIs Club:

Progression
Jenny Dalton drove in her 316th career RBI on a grand slam home run against Shawn Starling of Troy Trojans on May 17, 1996; Dalton surpassed former teammate Laura Espinoza for the record.

Leah Braatz became the third batter to collect 300 RBIs for a career in Pac-10 play of 1998. Sierra Romero drove in her career 300th RBI on May 20, 2016 to join the three others from Arizona who reached the career benchmark, all in the 1990s.

Base on Balls
In addition, there are currently 30 hitters in the 200 RBIs club that have amassed at least 150 walks in their career:

Stacey Nuveman – 240; Bailey Hemphill - 237; Kaitlin Cochran – 235; Erika Piancastelli - 229; Sierra Romero – 226; Kendyl Lindaman - 215; Kasey Cooper – 212; Lauren Chamberlain – 207; Jenny Topping – 200; Maddie O'Brien – 197; Alissa Goler – 184; Kristen Rivera – 180; Jenny Dalton – 178; Ivie Drake - 177; Jennifer Cline – 175; Lauren Haeger – 175; Leah Braatz – 173; Cheyenne Coyle – 171; Katelyn Boyd – 167; Megan Baltzell – 166; Sahvanna Jaquish – 165; Tori Vidales - 164; Katiyana Mauga – 158; Stacie Chambers – 158; Samantha Findlay – 157; Holly Tankersley – 156; Tonya Callahan – 154; Alex Hugo – 153; Tiffany Huff – 152; Taylor Edwards – 150.

Records & Milestones
Laura Espinoza set the NCAA record by driving in 128 RBIs in 1995; Nina Lindenberg tallied the fewest RBIs in a non-injury season with 17 the same year. Christi Orgeron claims the junior class record with 101 RBIs in 2011. Leticia Pineda, as a sophomore in 1996, drove in 96 RBIs for that class record. Along with Espinoza in 1995 and Orgeron in 2011, Jenny Dalton drove in 109 in 1996 and Leah Braatz 100 in 1998, are the only players to reach the 100 benchmark. Stephanie Best tied the record for single game RBIs by driving in 11 on March 9, 2003. Espinoza simultaneously set the season home run mark in 1995 with 37. Finally in 1996, Lindenberg also hit an NCAA record 29 doubles and drove in 60 RBIs.

Along with Espinoza in 1995 & (95 in 1994), Orgeron in 2011 & (94 in 2012), Pineda in 1996, Topping in 2000, Dalton in 1996 (98 in 1995 & 91 in 1994), Braatz in 1998, Stacie Chambers (96 in 2009), Stacey Nuveman (91 in 1999) and Angeline Quiocho (90 in 2010) all rank top-10 for RBIs in an NCAA season. Also with Espinoza in 1994 & 1995, Dalton in 1996, Braatz (78 in 1997) & 1998, Nuveman in 1999, Topping in 2000, Chambers in 2009, Quiocho in 2010, Orgeron in 2011 & 2012, Toni Mascarenas (84 in 2001), Jaime Clark (75 in 2002), Lovieanne Jung (79 in 2003), Samantha Findlay (77 in 2005), Ianeta Le'i (82 in 2006), Samantha Ricketts (81 in 2007), Charlotte Morgan (79 in 2008), Lauren Chamberlain (84 in 2013), Maddie O'Brien (83 in 2014), Chelsea Goodacre (86 in 2015), Tina Iosefa (87 in 2016), DJ Sanders (82 in 2017) and Hemphill (84 in 2019) led the NCAA in RBIs for those seasons.

Finally, Espinoza (48 in 1993) & 1994, Pineda in 1996 & (56 in 1997), Dalton (30 in 1993) 1994 & 1996, Braatz (75 in 1993) & 1997, Nuveman in 1999, Mascarenas in 2001, Findlay in 2005, Chamberlain in 2013, Lindenberg (77 in 1998), Amanda Scott (72 in 1998), Julie Marshall (67 in 1999), Mackenzie Vandergeest (61 in 2001), Tairia Flowers (70 in 2003), Kristie Fox (66 in 2006 & 63 in 2007), Kaitlin Cochran (51 in 2008), Katelyn Boyd (66 in 2011), Kalia Hunt (77 in 2012), Shelby Pendley (73 in 2013), Jessica Shults (45 in 2013), Lauren Haeger (67 in 2014 & 71 in 2015), Sydney Romero (39 in 2016 and 59 in 2017), Jessica Warren (70 in 2018) and Jocelyn Alo (89 in 2021) all won national championships those years. For their careers, Dalton (Pac-12), Sierra Romero (Big Ten), Orgeron (Sun Belt), Warren (ACC), Kasey Cooper (SEC), Chamberlain (Big 12), Jenna Cone (A-10), Jennifer Gilbert (MAC), Linda Rush (CAA), Jessica Purcell-Fitu (MWC), Vicky Galasso (Big Sky), Hayley Norton (NEC), Michelle Fuzzard (Southern), Samantha Iuli (Horizon), Morgan Noad (Big South), Best (A-Sun), Erika Piancastelli (Southland), Scott (WAC), Michelle Chmielewski (Summit), and Libby Sugg (WCC) hold the RBI crowns for those conferences.

References

Links
NCAA Division I softball career .400 batting average list
NCAA Division I softball career 50 home runs list

College softball in the United States lists